General elections were held in Denmark on 8 September 1987. Although the Social Democratic Party remained the largest in the Folketing with 54 of the 179 seats, the Conservative People's Party-led coalition government was able to continue. Voter turnout was 87% in Denmark proper, 69% in the Faroe Islands and 45% in Greenland.

Results

See also
List of members of the Folketing, 1987–1988

References

Elections in Denmark
Denmark
1987 elections in Denmark
September 1987 events in Europe